The Walloon platform for the IPCC was established with the assistance of the Walloon government in Belgium to facilitate contacts between the IPCC, the scientific world and politicians. GIEC is the French acronym of IPCC.

Activities 

 Monthly thematic information folder
 List of experts who can advice authorities, organisations and citizens 
 Monitoring the impacts of climate change Wallonia

Responsible person 
Professor Jean-Pascal van Ypersele

References

External links 

 Official website

Climate change organizations